4-Methyl-α-ethyltryptamine (4-Me-αET) is a putative stimulant, psychedelic, and entactogen drug of the tryptamine class. It is a designer drug and is sold online as a "research chemical".

Legality
4-Methyl-α-ethyltryptamine is illegal in Singapore.

See also 
 4-Methyl-αMT
 5-Fluoro-αET
 7-Chloro-αMT
 7-Methyl-αET

References 

Psychedelic tryptamines
Serotonin receptor agonists
Serotonin-norepinephrine-dopamine releasing agents
Entactogens and empathogens